David Tucker (born 29 September 1941) is a British sailor. He competed in the Dragon event at the 1968 Summer Olympics.

References

External links
 

1941 births
Living people
British male sailors (sport)
Olympic sailors of Great Britain
Sailors at the 1968 Summer Olympics – Dragon
Sportspeople from Aldershot